Higher Hurdsfield is a civil parish in Cheshire East, England. It contains 13 buildings that are recorded in the National Heritage List for England as designated listed buildings, all of which are at Grade II.  This grade is the lowest of the three gradings given to listed buildings and is applied to "buildings of national importance and special interest". The parish lies to the east of the town of Macclesfield, and is mainly rural. The Macclesfield Canal runs along is west border, and there are four listed structures associated with it, two bridges, a milestone, and a culvert with a weir and sluices. The other listed buildings are farmhouses, a former pumping engine house, now in residential use, a road milestone, and three boundary stones.

Buildings

See also

Listed buildings in Bollington
Listed buildings in Macclesfield
Listed buildings in Rainow

References
Citations

Sources

 

Listed buildings in the Borough of Cheshire East
Lists of listed buildings in Cheshire